Godachi is a pilgrim centre located near Ramdurg Taluk, Belgaum district, in the Indian State of Karnataka. Its temples include Veerabhadra, Kalamma and Maruti. It lies 14 km from Ramdurg.

Etymology
The name of the place is derived from that of the plant kodachi or godachi (Zizyphus xylopyrus), which grows abundantly in the area.

Temples
The Veerabhadra Temple  in Vijayanagar style has a garbhagriha  with a chalukyan doorway and a spacious main hall. The Veerabhadra image is of later date. Marriages are held in the temple. People visit this place daily, and more on Amavasya or Poornima days. The Temple has choultries all around. The annual Jatra is held in honour of Veerabhadra in December, when more than 30,000 people assemble. The copper plates of Chalukya Kirti-Varman were found here. According to legend, Shivasharanas on the way to Ulvi fought a battle here. The former Jahgirdar of Torgal shinde family  is the trustee of the Veerabhadra temple.

References

Hindu pilgrimage sites in India